The 2012–13 Erzgebirge Aue season was the 67th season in the club's history. The club competed in the 2. Bundesliga, the second tier of German football. It is the clubs third consecutive season in this league, having played at this level since 2010–11, following promotion from the 3. Liga in 2010.

The club also took part in the 2012–13 edition of the DFB-Pokal, where they reached the second round, losing 2–0 to Bundesliga side 1. FSV Mainz 05 next.

Friendly matches

Competitions

2. Bundesliga

League table

Matches

DFB-Pokal

References

External links
 2012–13 FC Erzgebirge Aue season at Worldfootball.net
 2012–13 FC Erzgebirge Aue season at kicker.de 
 2012–13 FC Erzgebirge Aue season at Fussballdaten.de 

Erzgebirge Aue
FC Erzgebirge Aue seasons